KCB may refer to:
 Kenya Commercial Bank Group
 Kenya Commercial Bank
 Kenya Commercial Bank S.C.
 Kenya Commercial Bank (Uganda)
 Knight Commander of the Order of the Bath
 Korean Catholic Bible
 Korfbal Club Barcelona
 Kerala Congress (B)
 Kawacha language
 Kansas City Ballet
 The , Belgrade, Serbia (KCB)